Jakub Buchel (born 16 September 2002) is a Slovak footballer who plays for FK Senica as a midfielder. He is the twin brother of FK Senica forward Filip Buchel.

Club career
Jakub Buchel made his professional Fortuna Liga debut for FK Senica against AS Trenčín on 16 February 2020.

References

External links
 FK Senica official club profile 
 
 Futbalnet profile 
 

2002 births
Living people
Slovak footballers
Association football midfielders
FK Senica players
Slovak Super Liga players